The British Virgin Islands national rugby union team represents the British Virgin Islands in international rugby union. The nation are a member of the International Rugby Board (IRB) and have yet to play in a Rugby World Cup tournament. The British Virgin Islands played their first international in 1996 – losing to Barbados 17 – 0.

The British Virgin Islands compete in the NACRA Caribbean Championship, a tournament which includes Antigua, Trinidad and Tobago, the Cayman Islands, Jamaica, the Bahamas, Bermuda, and Guyana.

Results

See also
 Rugby union in the British Virgin Islands

References

External links
 British Virgin Islands on IRB.com
 British Virgin Islands on rugbydata.com

Rugby union in the British Virgin Islands
Caribbean national rugby union teams
National sports teams of the British Virgin Islands